Nick Laird-Clowes (born 5 February 1957, in London, England) is an English musician and composer, best known as the lead singer and one of the principal songwriters for the Dream Academy. He co-wrote songs including "Life in a Northern Town", "The Love Parade", "The Edge of Forever", "This World", "Indian Summer", "Power to Believe" and "12/8 Angel".

Biography
Laird-Clowes was a member of Alfalpha (one album EMI 1977) and The Act (one album 1982, Too Late At 20, produced by Joe Boyd for his Hannibal label) before the Dream Academy. He was also a presenter for the first series of the Channel 4 music show The Tube.

The Dream Academy were formed in the 1980s and released three albums for Warner/Reprise: The Dream Academy (1985), Remembrance Days (1987) and A Different Kind Of Weather (1990).

His solo album, Mona Lisa Overdrive, was released under the name Trashmonk in 1999 on Alan McGee's Creation Records label, and re-released a few years later with two extra tracks ("Mr Karma" and "Fur Hat") under the reinvented PopTones label, again by McGee.

A friend of David Gilmour, with whom he co-produced both The Dream Academy and A Different Kind of Weather albums (Gilmour's younger brother Mark Gilmour had been guitarist in The Act), he also contributed lyrics to two songs on Pink Floyd's album The Division Bell. As Trashmonk, he opened for some of Gilmour's performances in the early 2000s. Gilmour also played on the Dream Academy's "Living in a War" and "The Chosen Few" first released retrospectively on the 2014 compilation The Morning Lasted All Day - A Retrospective in 2014.

In the 2000s, Laird-Clowes has been involved in film and documentary soundtracks, producing the score for The Invisible Circus, directed by Adam Brooks and starring Cameron Diaz. He was the musical consultant for Bernardo Bertolucci's The Dreamers, and was responsible for composing the music for Fierce People, a 2005 film directed by Griffin Dunne, starring Diane Lane and Donald Sutherland and for Wit Licht, directed by Jean van de Velde. Nick Broomfield's film Battle for Haditha, premiered at the London Film Festival in 2007, also had a Laird-Clowes soundtrack. In June 2009, he scored Broomfield's agitprop documentary for Greenpeace, A Time Comes, featuring the single "Mayday".

In May 2007, Laird-Clowes and Joe Boyd organised a Syd Barrett memorial concert, "The Madcap's Last Laugh", at the Barbican Centre in London, in which he also performed (the concert also featured both Pink Floyd and Roger Waters).

In 2013, he worked as both composer and music consultant for the Richard Curtis directed film, About Time. In 2016 Laird-Clowes played a series of Dream Academy concerts in Japan.

In 2017, he composed the music for the feature documentary, Whitney: Can I Be Me, directed by Nick Broomfield. In 2019, and also for Nick Broomfield, he composed the score for the acclaimed Universal film about Leonard Cohen, Marianne & Leonard: Words Of Love.

References

1957 births
Living people
English songwriters
English male singers
English television presenters
Singers from London
The Dream Academy members
British male songwriters